Forcing function can mean:
 In differential calculus, a function that appears in the equations and is only a function of time, and not of any of the other variables.
 In interaction design, a behavior-shaping constraint, a means of preventing undesirable user input usually made by mistake.
 A forcing function is any task, activity or event that forces one to take action and produce a result.